Jean Mikhael Paskalev Skaaden  (born 24 May 1987), better known as Mikhael Paskalev is a Norwegian singer, songwriter and guitarist from Ålesund. He is of partial Bulgarian origin.

Career
Paskalev studied at Liverpool Institute for Performing Arts, where he met with Norwegian artist Jonas Alaska. They played in each other's bands and musical projects. In February 2012, Paskalev was named Årets Urørt for 2012 as the best promising act by by:Larm. Paskalev released a self-titled EP Mikhael Paskalev in 2011 followed by a studio album What's Life Without Losers in 2012 produced by Joe Wills and recorded in Liverpool. The album entered the Top 10 of the Norwegian Albums Chart.

He remains most famous for "I Spy", an online viral music video directed by André Chocron. He has also released the single "Jive Babe" on his own independent record label Pretty Boy Floyd Records with distribution agreement with Universal Music Norway. For his European releases, he has agreements with Caramba label. He has taken part in many festivals in Norway including Øyafestivalen, Slottfjellfestivalen, By:Larm in 2011, Hove in 2012. He has also toured Europe most notably the UK, Netherlands, France, Belgium and Switzerland and has opened for Atomic Soul in Norway.

Discography

Albums

EPs
2012: ''Mikhael Paskalev [Pretty Boy Floyd Records]

Singles
2012: "I Spy" 
2012: "Jive Babe"
2013: "What's Life Without Losers"
2016: "Witness"

References

External links
Facebook

1987 births
Living people
21st-century Norwegian male singers
21st-century Norwegian singers
Musicians from Ålesund
Norwegian songwriters
Norwegian male musicians
Norwegian people of Bulgarian descent
Alumni of the Liverpool Institute for Performing Arts
Dew Process artists
Mom + Pop Music artists